Andrew Voysey (died 1653) was an English politician who sat in the House of Commons  in 1640.

Voysey was the son of Simon Voysey and his wife Joan Elliot. He was merchant of Dartmouth, Devon and also Mayor of Dartmouth in or before 1620. In 1626 he was concerned with fortifications for the town of Dartmouth.

In April 1640, Voysey was elected Member of Parliament for Dartmouth in the Short Parliament. 
 
Voysey was living at Ipplepen, where he signed the protestation return in 1641. He died in 1653 and was buried at Townstall on 22 May.

Voysey married Thomasine Martine, daughter of Robert Martine of Dartmouth.

References

Year of birth missing
1653 deaths
English MPs 1640 (April)
Mayors of Dartmouth, Devon
Members of the Parliament of England for Dartmouth